The following highways are numbered 823:

United States